Mut (from  or ) or Dakhla, is a city in the New Valley Governorate, Egypt. Its population was estimated at about 24,400 people in 2018.

References 

Populated places in New Valley Governorate